Luke Ward is a fictional character in The OC.

Luke Ward may also refer to:

Luke Ward, fictional character in The Mark of the Rani
Luke Warde (fl.1588), English sea captain

See also
Luke Ward-Wilkinson, English actor